Segundo Galicia Sánchez (August 11, 1938 – December 14, 2020) was a Peruvian professor and sociologist.

Career 
He completed a degree in Sociology from the National University of San Marcos, Lima, Peru; Master's in Social Sciences from the Latin American Faculty of Social Sciences (FLACSO) in Chile and a doctorate in Sociology from the Faculty of Political and Social Sciences of the National Autonomous University of Mexico, Mexico.

He served as a full-time professor and researcher, "C" holder of the Faculty of Social Sciences of the Autonomous University of Sinaloa, (UAS), Mexico; member of the Sistema Nacional de Investigadores. He was the leader of the Academic Body CA-156 "Society and Culture" and a member of the Core Core of the Master in Social Sciences. He was also a PROMEP-SEP Researcher-Evaluator.

Works 
 Introducción al estudio del conocimiento científico, Plaza y Valdés Editores, 
 El punto de partida del método científicamente correcto, Plaza y Valdés Editores, 
 El arte y la ciencia de enseñar, Plaza y Valdés Editores,

References 

1938 births
2020 deaths
People from La Libertad Region
Peruvian educators
Peruvian sociologists
Peruvian writers
National University of San Marcos alumni
National Autonomous University of Mexico alumni